Sunčani Breg is an urban neighborhood of Belgrade, the capital of Serbia. It is located in the Belgrade's municipality of Rakovica.

Location 

Sunčani Breg is the sub-neighborhood of Miljakovac, in its southern section, close to the quarry and the neighborhood of Straževica and Jelezovac, along the road of Kružni put. To the north and north-east it extendts into the neighborhood of Miljakovac III.

The neighborhood is situated on the southeast slopes of the  Straževica hill.

History 

Settlement developed in the mid 1990s. In plans for the urbanization of this area, it is projected as the one neighborhood with Jelezovac, Sunčani Breg-Jelezovac.

Characteristics 

The name of the neighborhood is descriptive, meaning sunny hill in Serbian. In 2009 it had about 300 houses.

Population 

Local community of Sunčani Breg, detached from the local community of Miljakovac, had a population of 3,018 in 2011.

References

External links

Neighborhoods of Belgrade
Rakovica, Belgrade